Tamamo may refer to:

Tamamo-no-Mae, a legendary figure in Japanese mythology
Tamamo Castle, or Takamatsu Castle (Sanuki),  is located in Takamatsu, Kagawa Prefecture, on the island of Shikoku, Japan
Tamamo Cross (foaled 1984), Japanese Thoroughbred racehorse